The Quiburis Formation is a geologic formation in Arizona. It preserves fossils dating back to the Neogene period.  It was entered into the National Register of Historic Places in 1971.

See also

 List of fossiliferous stratigraphic units in Arizona
 Paleontology in Arizona

References

 

Neogene Arizona